John Robert Roach (July 31, 1921 – July 11, 2003) was an American cleric of the Roman Catholic Church. He served as Archbishop of Saint Paul and Minneapolis from 1975 to 1995.

Biography
John Roach was born in Prior Lake, Minnesota, to Simon and Mary Roach. The eldest of three children, he had two younger sisters—Virginia and Mona. He attended public elementary school in Prior Lake, and studied for two years at Shakopee High School. In his junior year he transferred to Nazareth Hall Preparatory Seminary and began his studies for the priesthood. He proceeded to Saint Paul Seminary in 1941 for philosophy and theology. Due to the accelerated program of priestly formation put in place there during World War II, he was ordained a priest on June 18, 1946, while still 24 years old.

Roach served as a priest in a number of different assignments over the course of the next 25 years. On July 12, 1971, at the age of 49 he was appointed titular Bishop of Cenae and an auxiliary bishop of Saint Paul and Minneapolis; he was consecrated on September 8, 1971. Roach's archiepiscopate began on May 21, 1975, when he succeeded Archbishop Leo Binz and ended with the acceptance of his retirement on September 8, 1995. He was succeeded by coadjutor Archbishop Harry Flynn, and became the archbishop emeritus.

In 1977, Roach delivered the benediction at the inauguration of President Jimmy Carter.  He served as the president of the National Conference of Catholic Bishops/United States Catholic Conference from 1980-83.

Other
Roach made national news when he was arrested for drunk driving on February 21, 1985. He was discovered to have a blood alcohol count of 0.19, after driving his car into the wall of a convenience store.

Death
Roach died on July 11, 2003.

Notes

1921 births
2003 deaths
Saint Paul Seminary School of Divinity alumni
People from Scott County, Minnesota
20th-century Roman Catholic archbishops in the United States
Roman Catholic archbishops of Saint Paul and Minneapolis